Sir Thomas Stanley (1532/33–1576), of Winwick, Lancashire and Tong, Shropshire, was an English politician.

He was a Member (MP) of the Parliament of England for Lancashire in April 1554, November 1554 and 1555.

His tomb is in St Bartholomew's Church at Tong.

References

1530s births
1576 deaths
Members of the Parliament of England (pre-1707) for Lancashire
Politicians from Shropshire
English MPs 1554
English MPs 1554–1555
English MPs 1555